Michel Antoine (28 September 1925, Saarbrücken – 20 February 2015, Paris) was a French, modernist historian. 

A specialist of the state apparatus and the political civilization of the eighteenth century, Antoine was an archivist and paleographer, curator at the Archives nationales, research director at the Centre national de la recherche scientifique and professor at the University of Caen, then director of studies at the École pratique des hautes études from 1987.

Bibliography 
1948: Le Secrétariat d'État de Bertin, 1763-1780, École des chartes, Paris.
1951: Les comités de ministres sous le règne de Louis XV, Librairie du Recueil Sirey, Paris.
1953: À propos des dénombrements de population des duchés de Lorraine et de Bar sous le règle de Léopold, Berger-Levrault, Nancy.
1954: Antonio Vivaldi et François de Lorraine, Berger-Levrault, Nancy.
1954: Le fonds du Conseil d'État et de la chancellerie de Lorraine aux Archives nationales, Berger-Levrault, Nancy.
1955: Le fonds du Conseil d'État du Roi aux Archives nationales, Imprimerie nationale, Paris.
1955: Le Secret du roi et la Russie jusqu'à la mort de la czarine Elisabeth en 1762, co written with Didier Ozanam, C. Klincksieck, Paris.
11955: Correspondance secrète inédite de Louis XV et du général Monet (1767–1772), co written with Didier Ozanam, Imprimerie nationale, Paris.
1956: Autour de François Couperin, Heugel et Cie, Paris.
1956: Correspondance secrète du comte de Broglie avec Louis XV, 1756–1774, co written with Didier Ozanam, C. Klincksieck, Paris.
1958: Les Conseils des finances sous le règne de Louis XV, PUF, Paris.
1965: Les manufactures de tapisserie des ducs de Lorraine au XVIIIe siècle (1698–1737), Faculté des lettres et des sciences humaines de l'Université de Nancy/Berger-Levrault (Annales de l'Est, Mémoire n° 26), Nancy.
1965 : Henry Desmarest (1661 - 1741), Biographie Critique, Paris Éditions A. et J. Picard & Cie 1965
1968: Les Arrêts du Conseil rendus au XVIIIe siècle pour le Département de la marine : 1723–1791, Société française d'histoire d'outre-mer, Paris.
1968: Inventaire des arrêts du Conseil du roi, règne de Louis XV : arrêts en commandement : inventaire analytique, Archives nationales, Paris.
1971: Le Conseil du Roi sous le règne de Louis XV, Droz, Paris/Geneva 1971. Grand prix Gobert.
1973: Le Conseil royal des Finances au XVIIIe siècle et le registre E 3659 des Archives nationales, Droz, Geneva.
1978: Le gouvernement et l'administration sous Louis XV. Dictionnaire biographique, éd. du CNRS, Paris.
1986: Le dur métier de Roi. Études sur la civilisation politique de la France d'Ancien Régime, PUF, Paris.
1989: Louis XV, Fayard, Paris. (Prix Nouveau Cercle Interallié 1989)
2003: Le cœur de l'État : surintendance, contrôle général et intendances des finances, 1552-1791, Fayard, Paris.

External links 
 Michel Antoine (Fayard)
 Michel Antoine on Babelio
 Obituary on Parlement de Paris

1925 births
2015 deaths
20th-century French historians
École Nationale des Chartes alumni
Academic staff of the University of Caen Normandy
Academic staff of the École pratique des hautes études
Winners of the Prix Broquette-Gonin (literature)
People from Saarbrücken